Philip Anthony Butler (born 28 September 1972) is an English former footballer. A defender, he made 468 league appearances in a 15-year career in the English Football League.

He began his career at Gillingham in 1991, helping the club to win promotion out of the Third Division in 1995–96. He was sold to Blackpool in August 1996 for £225,000, before he was moved on to Port Vale for a £115,000 fee in March 1999. He then joined West Bromwich Albion in March 2000 for £140,000, and helped the "Baggies" to promotion out of the First Division in 2001–02. Following this he was allowed to sign with Bristol City, and he helped his new side to the League Trophy in 2003. He returned to Blackpool in February 2005, before he signed with Conference club Forest Green Rovers in July 2006. He was loaned out to Newport County, before he joined Hinckley United in February 2007. He switched to Alfreton Town in November 2007.

Career

Gillingham
As a child Butler moved to Redcar with his family – his father was a bank manager – and attended Ryehills School. He started his professional career at Gillingham in 1991–92, who were then a Fourth Division under the management of Damien Richardson. They finished second-from-bottom in the English Football League in 1992–93 under Glenn Roeder, avoiding relegation because they finished just four points ahead of Halifax Town. They finished 16th in 1993–94 under Mike Flanagan, before dropping to 19th in 1994–95. Butler played 42 games in 1995–96, as new boss Tony Pulis led the Priestfield Stadium club to promotion out of the Third Division (fourth tier) in second place. He made 179 appearances for the "Gills" in league and cup competitions, scoring seven goals.

Blackpool
Butler was sold to Blackpool in August 1996 for £225,000. He played 46 games in 1996–97 under Gary Megson, as the Bloomfield Road club finished one place and four points behind Crewe Alexandra in the Second Division play-off zone. New boss Nigel Worthington played him 43 times in 1997–98, as the "Seasiders" slipped to 12th. He made 23 appearances in 1998–99, with Blackpool on the way to another mid-table finish.

Port Vale and West Brom
He signed for Port Vale for a £115,000 fee in March 1999. He played just four games, as Brian Horton's "Valiants" managed to retain their First Division status despite a poor start to 1998–99. He featured 15 times in 1999–2000, before he left Vale Park for league rivals West Bromwich Albion in March 2000 for a £140,000 fee, as one of four deadline-day signings made by manager Gary Megson. Butler featured seven times for the "Baggies" in 1999–2000, as Megson steered the club away from the relegation zone – whilst Port Vale went down. He made 51 appearances in 2000–01, as Albion reached the play-offs, only to be defeated by Bolton Wanderers at the semi-final stage. It was in this season that he scored his only goal for the club, in a 2–1 loss to Birmingham City. He featured 23 times as the club won promotion as runners-up in 2001–02, finishing ten points behind champions Manchester City. He featured in the "Battle of Bramall Lane" on 16 March 2002, replacing Lárus Sigurðsson (the only "Baggies" player to have been booked) 14 minutes before the match was abandoned. With the club now in the Premier League, he found himself surplus to requirements at The Hawthorns, and was loaned out to Bristol City, for whom he subsequently signed permanently.

Bristol City and return to Blackpool
He played for City in the final of the League Trophy at the Millennium Stadium, as the "Robins" beat Carlisle United 2–0. They also reached the play-offs in 2002–03, but were beaten by Cardiff City at the semi-final stage; Butler played 51 games over the course of the campaign. He played 46 games in 2003–04, including the play-off final at the Millennium Stadium, where Danny Wilson's men were beaten 1–0 by Brighton & Hove Albion. He played 27 games under new boss Brian Tinnion in 2004–05, before leaving Ashton Gate for former club Blackpool on a free transfer in February 2005. They finished the season 16th in League One under Colin Hendry. Butler played 26 games in 2005–06, as Blackpool avoided relegation by just two places and three points, and was released by manager Simon Grayson. He scored once for Blackpool, his goal coming in a 4–2 win over Doncaster Rovers.

Later career
Butler joined Gary Owers' Forest Green Rovers in July 2006. During the 2006–07 season he was loaned out to Conference South side Newport County. In February 2007, Butler joined Hinckley United of the Conference North. He was released by Hinckley in November 2007, and subsequently signed for league rivals Alfreton Town.

Career statistics
Source:

Honours
Gillingham
Football League Third Division second-place promotion: 1995–96

West Bromwich Albion
Football League First Division second-place promotion: 2001–02

Bristol City
Football League Trophy: 2003

References

1972 births
Living people
Footballers from Stockport
English footballers
Association football central defenders
Gillingham F.C. players
Blackpool F.C. players
Port Vale F.C. players
West Bromwich Albion F.C. players
Bristol City F.C. players
Forest Green Rovers F.C. players
Hinckley United F.C. players
Newport County A.F.C. players
Alfreton Town F.C. players
English Football League players
National League (English football) players